Popice may refer to places:

Popice, Czech Republic, a municipality in the South Moravian Region
Popice, a village and part of Znojmo in the South Moravian Region
Popice, Poland, a village